Sankt Veit im Mühlkreis is a municipality in the district of Rohrbach in the Austrian state of Upper Austria.

Geography
Sankt Veit im Mühlkreis lies in the far east of the district of Rohrbach in the upper Mühlviertel. About 27 percent of the municipality is forest, and 67 percent is farmland.

References

Cities and towns in Rohrbach District